Edith Grabo is a retired slalom canoeist who competed for East Germany in the 1960s. She won two medals at the ICF Canoe Slalom World Championships, with a gold in 1965 (Mixed C-2 team) and a bronze in 1967 (Mixed C-2).

References

East German female canoeists
Possibly living people
Year of birth missing (living people)
Medalists at the ICF Canoe Slalom World Championships